Erlulph (died 830) was a Scottish missionary and 10th Bishop of Verden who was martyred by pagans in Germany.
His feast day is 10 February.

Life

John O'Hanlon (1821–1905) wrote that very little is known of Erlulph's life and career beyond two paragraphs by the Bollandists for 2 February.
John Colgan (1592–1658) classed him among the Irish saints.
Dempster gives his feast day as 22 February and Camerarius says it was 10 February.

Charlemagne introduced Christianity to Saxony around 780 and founded bishoprics at Minden and Verden.
Some say that Erlulph died in 815.
Another account says he died at a place named Eppockstorp or Ebbeckstorp in 830, 839 or 856, killed by pagan Saxons or Norsemen.
Others say that he was the 10th bishop of Verden and was living there in 876.
Dempster says that Erlulph was the 9th biship of Verden and the last of the Scottish bishops.

The relics of the bishops were found in 1630 during repair of the old cathedral of Verden and were encased in a casket.
In 1659 Bishop Francis William took the relics with him to Regensburg when he fled from the Swedes.

Butler's account

The hagiographer Alban Butler wrote in his Lives of the primitive fathers, martyrs, and other principal saints (1798),

Notes

Citations

Sources

Medieval Scottish saints
830 deaths
Roman Catholic bishops of Verden